Dominique Forlini (Paris, 14 September 1924 - October 2014) was a French professional road bicycle racer. Forlini won many six-day racing events, and also some road victories, most importantly two stages in the 1954 Tour de France.

Major results

1950
Paris - Valenciennes
1954
Six days of Berlin (with Emile Carrera)
Six days of Brussels (with Georges Senfftleben)
Tour de France:
Winner stages 6 and 15
1955
European championship track madison (with Georges Senfftleben)
Six days of Frankfurt (with Georges Senfftleben)
1956
Six days of Copenhagen (with Georges Senfftleben)
1959
Daumesnil

External links 

Official Tour de France results for Dominique Forlini

French male cyclists
1924 births
2014 deaths
French Tour de France stage winners
Cyclists from Paris